Kenneth Banks (19 October 1923 – 9 August 1994) was an English footballer and coach. He played as a wing half for Southport and Wigan Athletic.

Career
Banks started his career at Southport, initially signing as an amateur before turning professional a couple of months later. After six years at the club, he returned to his hometown to play for Wigan Athletic. Between 1952 and 1959, he played 180 games and scored 21 goals for the club in the Lancashire Combination.

After the end of his playing career, Banks moved into coaching. He began coaching the reserves at Wigan Athletic, and was eventually appointed as first-team coach. In 1984, Banks and Duncan Colquhoun were awarded a testimonial by Wigan Athletic.

References

External links

1923 births
1994 deaths
Footballers from Wigan
English footballers
Association football wing halves
Southport F.C. players
Wigan Athletic F.C. players
English Football League players
Wigan Athletic F.C. non-playing staff